Landergin, Texas is a ghost town in Oldham County, Texas, USA. It was founded in 1908 as a stop on the Chicago, Rock Island and Gulf Railway. It was on a ranch which belonged to Patrick H. Landergin and his brother John. According to the Handbook of Texas Online, "In 1936 Landergin reported one store and a population of fifteen."

References

1908 establishments in Texas
Oldham County, Texas
Ghost towns in Texas
Unincorporated communities in Oldham County, Texas
Unincorporated communities in Texas